R-28 regional road is a Montenegrin roadway.

History

R-28 regional road was first built as a Bar - Virpazar railroad. Construction on this railway started in 1905. In 1959, all operations on this railway stopped, after which it was adapted for road transport.

In November 2019, the Government of Montenegro published bylaw on categorisation of state roads. With new categorisation, R-28 regional road was created from municipal road.

Major intersections

References

R-28